Alarm Bells (Italian: Campane a martello) is a 1949 Italian drama film directed by Luigi Zampa and starring Gina Lollobrigida, Yvonne Sanson and Eduardo De Filippo.

Location shooting took place on Ischia in the Gulf of Naples. The film's sets were designed by the art director Piero Gherardi. A separate English-language version Children of Chance was produced. It was directed by Zampa but otherwise featured a different British cast of actors. It took around 113 million lira at the box office.

Plot
Agostina has been working as a prostitute during World War II, has been sending the money she has saved back to her hometown priest for safekeeping. After the war she returns to the island with her friend Australia, planning to open a clothing shop. However, she discovers that the Priest had been dead a year and his successor believing that the money was a donation has spent it all on an orphanage for those who have lost their parents in the war.

Cast
 Gina Lollobrigida as Agostina
 Yvonne Sanson as Australia
 Eduardo De Filippo as Don Andrea
 Carlo Giustini as Marco
 Carlo Romano as Gendarme
 Clelia Matania as Bianca
 Agostino Salvietti as Mayor
 Ernesto Almirante as Landowner
  as Butcher
 Salvatore Arcidiacono as The Pharmacist
 Ada Colangeli as Francesca
 Carlo Pisacane as Filippo the altar boy
 Francesco Santoro as Franco
 Vittoria Febbi as Connie
 Pasquale Misiano as Chauffeur

See also
 Children of Chance (1949)

References

Bibliography
 Chiti, Roberto & Poppi, Roberto. Dizionario del cinema italiano: Dal 1945 al 1959. Gremese Editore, 1991.

External links

1949 films
1949 drama films
1940s multilingual films
Italian drama films
Italian multilingual films
1940s Italian-language films
Italian black-and-white films
Films directed by Luigi Zampa
Films produced by Carlo Ponti
Films scored by Nino Rota
Lux Film films
1940s Italian films